Galina Yanovna Vecherkovskaya (also Putyrskaya, born 27 June 1926) is a Russian retired rower who won five European titles between 1955 and 1962.

Vecherkovskaya was born in Leningrad, but during World War II her family lived in Ryazan Oblast. Her father, Jan Kazimirovich, was an engineer who was executed during the Stalin's purges in late 1930s. Vecherkovskaya started training in rowing in 1947, when she enrolled to the Lesgaft Institute of Physical Education (GDOIFK). She graduated in 1951 and until 1984 lectured at GDOIFK; after that, between 1984 and 1997 she worked as a physician at a city hospital for children. Around 1948 Vecherkovskaya married her coach, Kiril Putyrski, and for some time competed under his name as Galina Putyrskaya; they divorced around 1960.

Before the 1955 European Championships, Vecherkovskaya and her partner Mikhailova were medal favorites in double sculls. However, two rowers of the Soviet coxed four became pregnant, and to save the team Vecherkovskaya and Mikhailova were merged into the coxed four that resulted in a gold medal.

References

1926 births
Living people
Russian female rowers
Soviet female rowers
European Rowing Championships medalists
Rowers from Saint Petersburg